Hannah Rankin (born 21 July 1990) is a Scottish professional boxer and bassoonist. She has held the WBA female super-welterweight title since November 2021. She has also held the IBO title in 2019 and challenged for the WBA female super-middleweight title in 2018; the unified WBA, WBC, and IBF female middleweight titles in 2018; and the WBO female middleweight title in 2020. As of October 2020, she is ranked as the fifth best active female middleweight by The Ring and sixth by BoxRec.

Early life 

Hannah Rankin was born on 21 July 1990 and grew up on her family's Edentaggart farm in Luss, Scotland. As a child, she attended Hermitage Academy in Helensburgh, Scotland, and gained an interest in contact sports at aged nine after enrolling in taekwondo classes with her younger sister. Aside from sports she also had an interest in music, learning to play the flute at school and eventually switching to the bassoon. As an accomplished bassoonist, she attended the Royal Conservatoire of Scotland in Glasgow, and later the Royal Academy of Music in London, where she earned a master's degree in 2016. She continues her musical career alongside boxing, teaching music to children and performing in her quintet "Coriolis" at care homes and schools.

Professional career 
Rankin made her professional debut on 21 May 2017, against Ester Konecna at the SkyLark Hotel in Essex, England, winning via points decision (PTS) over six rounds. She fought a further three times in 2017; a points decision win over Borislava Goranova in September; a split decision (SD) loss to Joanna Ekedahl in October; and a points decision win in a rematch with Ester Konecna in November.

She started 2018 with a first-round technical knockout (TKO) win over Klaudia Vigh in January, before facing Sarah Turunen for her first professional title on 16 June 2018, at the Lagoon Leisure Centre in Paisley, Scotland. Rankin won via unanimous decision (100–90, 100–91, 99–91) over ten rounds to capture the vacant WBC Silver female middleweight title.

Two months later, she made her first attempt at a world title on 4 August 2018, challenging reigning world champion Alicia Napoleon for the WBA female super-middleweight title at the Nassau Coliseum in Uniondale, New York. Rankin lost by unanimous decision with one judge scoring the bout 99–91, and the other two scoring it 98–92, all in favour of Napoleon.

In her next fight, Rankin made a second attempt at world honours on 17 November 2018, against two-time Olympic gold medalist and reigning unified WBA and IBF female middleweight champion, Claressa Shields, with the vacant WBC title also up for grabs. The bout took place at the Kansas Star Arena in Mulvane, Kansas. Shields was originally scheduled to face undefeated WBO middleweight champion Christina Hammer, who pulled out due to illness. Rankin suffered the third loss of her professional career via unanimous decision, with all three judges scoring the bout 100–90 in a contest that many outlets described as a dominant performance by Shields.

Following a points decision win over Eva Bajic in January 2019, Rankin made a third attempt for a world title against Sarah Curran on 15 June 2019, for the vacant IBO super-welterweight title. The bout took place at the Lagoon Leisure Centre in Paisley, Scotland. Rankin scored a ten-round unanimous decision victory, with all three judges scoring the bout 96–94, to become Scotland's first female world champion. After a six-round unanimous decision win over Erin Toughill in a non-title bout in October, Rankin made the first defence of her title against undefeated WBC interim champion Patricia Berghult on 27 November 2019, at the Hotel Intercontinental in St. Julian's, Malta. In a fight that saw Rankin dropped in the first-round by a left hook, she lost her IBO title by unanimous decision over ten rounds. Two judges scored the bout 96–93 while the third scored it 95–94, all in favour of Berghult.

Professional boxing record

References

External links

Scottish women boxers
1990 births
Living people
Light-middleweight boxers
International Boxing Organization champions
Alumni of the Royal Conservatoire of Scotland
Alumni of the Royal Academy of Music
Scottish classical bassoonists
Sportspeople from Argyll and Bute
People educated at Hermitage Academy